Jeffrey "Jeff" Seidel (born 1957) is a kiruv (Orthodox Jewish outreach) personality in Jerusalem. Since 1982, he has introduced thousands of Jewish college students to their first Shabbat experience and offered free tours and classes through his Jewish Student Information Centers in Jerusalem, Tel Aviv, Beersheba, and Herzliya. He also compiled The Jewish Traveler's Resource Guide, which lists Shabbat placement programs around the world.

Early life and education
Jeffrey Seidel was born in Chicago, Illinois. He attended public school and then graduated from the Ida Crown Jewish Academy in 1975. He decided to leave university in the middle of studying for his doctorate in psychology to move to Israel in 1981.

Outreach career
Concurrent with the rise of the baal teshuva movement in Israel in the 1970s, a small number of Orthodox outreach workers began frequenting the Western Wall and inviting English-speaking, college-age students and travelers to experience a Shabbat meal with a host family or to join a free tour of Jewish sites in the Old City. These outreach workers included Rabbi Meir Schuster, Baruch Levine, and, beginning in 1982, Jeff Seidel. In the beginning, Seidel placed around 15 young people for Shabbat meals each week; as he expanded his list of local families willing to host drop-in guests for Shabbat meals, these numbers grew to about 150 per week in the early 2000s and have since averaged 100 per week. He also places visiting yeshiva students. Seidel also led walking tours of the Jewish Quarter of the Old City and escorted interested students to baal teshuva yeshivas so they could see traditional Jewish learning in action.

Seidel founded the Jewish Student Information Center in Jerusalem's Old City in 1986. The Center offered free walking tours in the Jewish Quarter, archaeological tours, and religious and holiday classes. Seidel also compiled The Jewish Traveler's Resource Guide, which lists similar Shabbat placement programs around the world. According to Kaplan, this guide became "one of the most effective ways of recruiting potential baalei teshuva".

Seidel established a second Jewish Student Information Center near the Hebrew University of Jerusalem in 1992, providing Shabbat meal placement, laundry and email services, lectures, and a wide-screen television for students. He opened a center near Tel Aviv University in 1994, and subsequently opened centers at Ben Gurion University in Beersheba and the Interdisciplinary Center Herzliya.

The Jeff Seidel Jewish Student Information Center offers $400 scholarships toward airfare for former Birthright participants and Hillel alumni who wish to study in Israel. He also runs an online Worldwide Passover Hospitality project which pairs up students and young tourists with host families around the world for the Passover Seder, and arranges meals for 200 to 300 travelers in Israel and around the world between Rosh Hashana and Sukkot.

As of 2017, Seidel publishes a weekly op-ed on the Israeli-based news website The Times of Israel. His topics include Jewish continuity, Jewish outreach, current events, and anti-Semitism on college campuses.

Personal life
Seidel married Penina Greene, daughter of scientist, academic, and Chabad baal teshuva Professor Velvl Greene. She is an oncology nurse at the Hadassah Medical Center on Mount Scopus. They live in the Jewish Quarter of the Old City in Jerusalem.

In December 2014 Seidel's car was attacked by more than one dozen Arab youths as he drove two friends to the Jewish cemetery on the Mount of Olives. His car sustained 4,000 shekels ($1,000) worth of damage, but he was uninjured. One of his passengers was treated for a scratched cornea caused by splintered glass.

References

External links
"Jeff Seidel: A Pioneer of Jewish Outreach And Engagement" (video) The Jewish Week, September 24, 2012
"Jeff Seidel Making his Mark on Jerusalem, One College Student at a Time" (video) ''Voice of Israel, November 13, 2014

1957 births
American Orthodox Jews
People from Chicago
People from Jerusalem
Living people